The Best of Wanda Jackson is a compilation album by American recording artist Wanda Jackson. It was released in February 1968 via Capitol Records and contained 12 previously-released tracks. It was Jackson's third compilation album released in her career and featured some of Jackson's most commercially-successful singles up to that point. The album reached a charting position on the country LP's survey in the United States following its release.

Background, content and release
On the Capitol Records label, Wanda Jackson recorded both Rockabilly and Country music. During the 1950s, Jackson released several Rockabilly-styled singles, notably the top 40 pop hit "Let's Have a Party". She then recorded country music in the 1960s and had top ten country hits in the United States, including "Right or Wrong". The Best of Wanda Jackson contained her most popular Rockabilly and Country songs, all of which had been previously released. The album's material was recorded in sessions between 1958 and 1966 produced by Ken Nelson. A total of 12 songs were chosen for the compilation. Three of these recordings were composed by Jackson herself. 

The Best of Wanda Jackson was released on Capitol Records in February 1968. It was the third compilation release of Jackson's music career and the second issued for the English language market. The album was originally distributed as a vinyl LP, containing six songs on either side of the record. The LP spent seven weeks on the Billboard Top Country Albums in the United States, peaking at number 29 in April 1968. It was her fifth album to reach the Billboard country chart and her first compilation to do so.

Track listing

Vinyl version

Chart performance

Release history

References

1968 compilation albums
Albums produced by Ken Nelson (United States record producer)
Capitol Records albums
Wanda Jackson compilation albums